Bashir Isse, also known as Bashir Issa Ali, is a Somali banker. He previously served as the CEO of the Commercial and Savings Bank of Somalia, and as both the Deputy Governor and Governor of the Central Bank of Somalia. As of April 2014, he is the Central Bank's permanent Governor.

Background

Personal life
For his post-secondary education, Isse studied at the American Century University, where he earned a BA in Business Administration. He later received a Master's of Public Administration from the same institution. Isse also has a degree in Armed Conflict and Peace Studies from the University of Nairobi.

Early career
Isse is a veteran banker with many years of experience. He began his career in banking in the 1960s and had held a number of top positions.

Between 1962 and 1968, Isse worked at the Central Bank of Somalia in both commercial and central banking operations. He was later promoted to the monetary authority's Chief Auditor in 1969-70.

From 1971 to 1973, Isse acted as the Deputy Director General of the Somali Commercial Bank, as well as its successor the Commercial and Savings Bank of Somalia.

In 1975, Isse served as Head of a national commission tasked with reforming Somalia's financial system and its administration of state-owned firms.

Isse subsequently was the Deputy Director General and then CEO and President of the Commercial Savings Bank of Somalia between 1976-81.

In the 1981-88 period, Isse acted as the Deputy Governor of the Central Bank of Somalia. He helped the then Governor establish and formulate the monetary authority's policies and strategies.

From 2006 to 2010, Isse served as Governor of the Central Bank of Somalia during the Transitional Federal Government (TFG) under President Abdullahi Yusuf Ahmed. Isse was largely responsible for re-establishing the Bank after it had closed down during the civil war. He later resigned from the post after disagreements between TFG Finance Minister Sharif Hassan Sheikh Aden and TFG President Sharif Sheikh Ahmed's administration over the printing of new banknotes.

Central Bank of Somalia
On 27 November 2013, Isse was re-appointed on an interim basis as Somalia's Central Bank Governor, following the resignation of his predecessor Yussur A.F. Abrar earlier in the month. According to incumbent Finance Minister Mohamud Hassan Suleiman, Isse's appointment came a day after Federal Government of Somalia President Hassan Sheikh Mohamud met with international donor representatives in Mogadishu to discuss a temporary replacement at the position. The Council of Ministers later endorsed the selection on 28 November. On 24 April 2014, the federal Cabinet approved Isse as the new permanent Governor of the Central Bank of Somalia. Maryan Abdullahi Yusuf was also named his new Deputy Governor.

Notes

References

External links
Bashir Issa Ali - Curriculum vitae

Living people
Ethnic Somali people
Governors of Central Bank of Somalia
Somalian economists
Year of birth missing (living people)